is a 1986 Japanese drama film directed by Yoji Yamada. It was Japan's submission to the 59th Academy Awards for the Academy Award for Best Foreign Language Film, but was not accepted as a nominee.

Cast
 Kiyoshi Atsumi as Kihachi
 Kiichi Nakai as Kenjiro Shimada
 Narimi Arimori as Koharu Tanaka (inspired by Kinuyo Tanaka)
 Keiko Matsuzaka as Sumie Kawashima (inspired by Yoshiko Okada)
 Ittoku Kishibe as Ogata (inspired by Yasujirō Ozu)
 Chishū Ryū as Tomo-san
 Hajime Hana
 Kaori Momoi
 Nana Kinomi
 Senri Sakurai
 Akira Emoto
 Masaaki Sakai (inspired by Torajirō Saitō)
 Mitsuru Hirata
 Gin Maeda
 Hidetaka Yoshioka as Mitsuo
 Chieko Baisho
 Matsumoto Kōshirō VIII (special appearance) as Shirota (inspired by Shirō Kido)
 Kanbi Fujiyama (special appearance)

See also
 List of submissions to the 59th Academy Awards for Best Foreign Language Film
 List of Japanese submissions for the Academy Award for Best Foreign Language Film

References

External links

1986 films
1986 drama films
Japanese drama films
1980s Japanese-language films
1980s Japanese films